SS1 may refer to:

Transportation
 SS 1, a British car of the 1930s and predecessor to the Jaguar
 China Railways SS1, an electric locomotive model used in China
 Moore SS-1, a glider
 Reliant Scimitar SS1, a sports car made by Reliant during the 1980s

Military and space
 USS Holland (SS-1), the first submarine of the U.S. Navy
 SpaceShipOne, a spaceplane that completed the first privately funded crewed space flight
 Pindad SS1, an Indonesian assault rifle
 SS-1 Scud, the NATO reporting name for a series of Soviet missiles

Other uses
 SS1 (classification), a Les Autres sport classification
 Sky Sports 1, a British satellite sports channel
 Space Ship One (album), an album by Paul Gilbert